Anthology 1: Greatest Hits 1986–1997 (simply known as Greatest Hits outside of Australia and New Zealand) is a greatest hits compilation album by Australian singer John Farnham. The album was released in Australia on 29 September 1997, and is the first of a three disc Anthology set, it coincided with Farnham celebrating his 30th Anniversary in music.

This album reached No. 1 in the ARIA charts in October, and yielded a No. 3 hit single with the Human Nature and John Farnham collaboration, "Every Time You Cry".

In 2009, the album was reissued with the title Greatest Hits. The album was certified 5× platinum in Australia in 2020.

Track listing
 "You're the Voice" (M. Ryder, C. Thompson, A. Qunta, K. Reid) – 5:02
 "Pressure Down" (H. Bogdanovs) – 3:45
 "A Touch of Paradise" (R. Wilson, G. Smith) – 4:44
 "Reasons" (S. See) – 4:26
 "Two Strong Hearts" (B. Woolley, A. Hill) – 3:31
 "Age Of Reason" (T. Hunter, J. Pigott) – 5:06
 "That's Freedom" (Tom Kimmel, J. Chapman) – 4:17
 "Chain Reaction" (David A Stewart, S. Stewart) – 3:12
 "Burn for You" (Phil Buckle, J. Farnham, R. Faser) – 3:32
 "Seemed Like A Good Idea (At The Time)" (edit) (R. Wilson, J. Farnham, R. Fraser) – 3:46
 "Talk of the Town" (S. Howard) – 3:41
 "Angels" (T. Kimmel, J. Kimball) – 5:44
 "Have a Little Faith (In Us)" (edit) (R. Desalvo, A. Roman) – 4:46
 "A Simple Life" (J. Lind, R. Page) – 3:58
 "Heart's On Fire" (edit) (T. Kimmel, S. Lynch) – 4:16
 "When Something Is Wrong with My Baby" (with Jimmy Barnes) (J. Hayes, D. Porter) – 4:56
 "Everytime You Cry" (with Human Nature) (S. Peiken, G. Sutton) – 4:47

The VHS release includes all songs from “Anthology 1” (“Reasons” is a live version, and “Pressure Down” is an edit of the 12” extended remix) and includes “Please Don’t Ask Me”, “All Kinds of People” and “The Making of Age of Reason” as bonus tracks. All videos except for “Reasons” also appear on One Voice: The Greatest Clips.

Charts

Weekly charts

Year-end charts

Certifications

See also
 List of number-one albums of 1997 (Australia)

References 

1997 greatest hits albums
John Farnham compilation albums